Daughters of Dolma is a feature-length documentary about spirituality, modernity and gender issues as embodied by Tibetan Buddhist Nuns. It is directed by Adam Miklos and produced by Alex Co.

References

2013 films
Documentary films about Buddhism
Documentary films about women and religion
Buddhist nuns